Hypsotropa roseotincta is a species of snout moth in the genus Hypsotropa. It was described by Anthonie Johannes Theodorus Janse in 1922 and is known from South Africa.

References

Endemic moths of South Africa
Moths described in 1922
Anerastiini